The Pacific is a 2010 American war drama miniseries produced by HBO, Playtone, and DreamWorks that premiered in the United States on March 14, 2010.

The series is a companion piece to the 2001 miniseries Band of Brothers and focuses on the United States Marine Corps's actions in the Pacific Theater of Operations within the wider Pacific War. Whereas Band of Brothers followed the men of Easy Company of the 506th Parachute Infantry Regiment through the European Theater, The Pacific centers on the experiences of three Marines (Robert Leckie, Eugene Sledge, and John Basilone) who were in different regiments (1st, 5th, and 7th, respectively) of the 1st Marine Division.

The Pacific was spearheaded by Bruce C. McKenna (co-executive producer), one of the main writers on Band of Brothers. Hugh Ambrose, the son of Band of Brothers author Stephen Ambrose, served as a project consultant.

The Pacific miniseries features the 1st Marine Division's battles in the Pacific, such as Guadalcanal, Cape Gloucester, Peleliu, and Okinawa, as well as Basilone's involvement in the Battle of Iwo Jima. It is based primarily on the memoirs of two US Marines: With the Old Breed: At Peleliu and Okinawa by Eugene Sledge and Helmet for My Pillow by Robert Leckie. It also draws on Sledge's memoir China Marine and Red Blood, Black Sand, the memoir of Chuck Tatum, a Marine who fought alongside Basilone at Iwo Jima.

Cast 
The following actors played starring roles in multiple episodes and are split by the principal character they appear in relation to. Characters from the different plot strands do occasionally interact, while Sidney Phillips both serves with Leckie and is the best friend of Sledge.

 James Badge Dale as Pfc. Robert Leckie (1920–2001)
 Ashton Holmes as Cpl. Sidney Phillips (1924–2015)
 Josh Helman as Pfc. Lew "Chuckler" Juergens (1918–1982)
 Keith Nobbs as Pfc. Wilbur "Runner" Conley (1921–1997)
 Jacob Pitts as Pfc. Bill "Hoosier" Smith (1922–1985)
 Toby Leonard Moore as 2nd Lt. Stone
 Henry Nixon as 1st Lt. Hugh Corrigan (1920–2005)
 Tom Budge as Pfc. Ronnie Gibson
 Caroline Dhavernas as Vera Keller
 Joseph Mazzello as Cpl. Eugene Sledge (1923–2001)
 Rami Malek as Cpl. Merriell "Snafu" Shelton (1922–1993)
 Martin McCann as Sgt. R.V. Burgin (1922–2019)

 Brendan Fletcher as Pfc. Bill Leyden (1926–2008)
 Linda Cropper as Mary Frank Sledge (1893–1989)
 Conor O'Farrell as Dr. Sledge (1887–1954)
 Dylan Young as Pfc. Jay De L'Eau (1923–1997)
 Leon Ford as 1st Lt. Edward "Hillbilly" Jones (1917–1944)
 Scott Gibson as Capt. Andrew Haldane (1917–1944)
 Gary Sweet as MGySgt. Elmo "Gunny" Haney (1898–1979)
 Jon Seda as GySgt. John Basilone (1916–1945)
 Joshua Bitton as Sgt. J.P. Morgan (1919–1980)
 William Sadler as Lt. Col. Lewis "Chesty" Puller (1898–1971)
 Jon Bernthal as Sgt. Manuel "Manny" Rodriguez (1922−1942)
 Annie Parisse as Sgt. Lena Basilone (1913–1999)

Production 

The Pacific was produced by Steven Spielberg, Tom Hanks, and Gary Goetzman in association with HBO Miniseries, Playtone, DreamWorks, Seven Network and Sky Movies. Seven and Sky both invested in the project for the right to broadcast it in Australia and the United Kingdom respectively. Nine Network has previously broadcast the HBO productions of Band of Brothers. Nine had a broadcast deal with HBO's parent Warner Bros., but then HBO started to distribute its own productions separately. In April 2007, the producers set up a production office in Melbourne and began casting.

Originally the project was estimated at $100 million to produce, but ended up costing over $200 million, making The Pacific the most expensive television miniseries ever created at the time. According to the Sydney Morning Herald an estimated A$134 million was spent in Australia. The Australian newspaper Herald Sun estimates that it brought 4,000 jobs and generated A$180 million for the Australian economy.

Filming of the miniseries in Australia started on August 10, 2007, and finished in late May 2008. From August until November 2007 filming took place at locations in and around Port Douglas, Queensland including Mossman, Queensland; Drumsara Plantation, Mowbray National Park and beaches at Rocky Point, Queensland. Production then moved to rural Victoria, in the You Yangs near Lara (from November–December 2007), then at a sand quarry on Sandy Creek Road near Geelong until February 2008. Melbourne city locations were used in late 2007 and through 2008 including Central City Studios at Melbourne Docklands (March 2008); Flinders Street (between Swanston and Elizabeth streets, February 1–4, 2008); the intersection of Swanston and Flinders streets (February 2008); Flinders Street station (February 2–3, 2008). Other suburban locations included Mornington Railway, Bundoora, specifically the Ernest Jones Hall at the La Trobe University campus, Bundoora (late May 2008); the Railway Hotel, South Melbourne (December 2007); Scotch College, Melbourne (December 2007); Melbourne High School (December 2007).

The series's score was written by Hans Zimmer, Geoff Zanelli and Blake Neely and was released on March 9, 2010.

Historian Hugh Ambrose, son of Band of Brothers author Stephen E. Ambrose, wrote the official tie-in book to the miniseries, The Pacific: Hell was an Ocean Away (2011), which follows the stories of two of the featured men from the miniseries, Basilone and Sledge, as well as stories of Sledge's close friend Sidney Phillips and two men not featured in the series, marine officer Austin Shofner and US Navy pilot Vernon Micheel. The different cast provides a wider view of the Pacific theatre, allowing the book to include the fall of the Philippines, Midway, Philippine Sea and Luzon and expand the narrative to include depictions of life as experienced by prisoners of war, senior officers and the development of naval aviation. It was published in the UK and the US in March 2010 and Ambrose gave a webcast interview about the book at the Pritzker Military Library on April 15, 2010.

Broadcast 
The series premiered in the US and Canada on March 14, 2010, on HBO. HBO Asia premiered The Pacific at 9 pm on April 3, 2010, with the first two episodes being consecutively broadcast in the first week. Singapore, Hong Kong, and Indonesia had dual language available. Singapore, Hong Kong, Taiwan, Malaysia, and Philippines broadcasts were available in high-definition on the HBO Asia HD Channel. The Pacific began broadcast on April 5, 2010 on Sky Movies in the United Kingdom and Ireland. In Portugal, the series was broadcast on April 5, 2010 on AXN and in HD on AXN HD two days after the original broadcast in the US. The series broadcast commenced in Australia on Channel 7 on Wednesday, April 14, 2010, at 8:30 pm. In Denmark, Norway, Finland, France and Sweden, the series began broadcasting on Canal+; in Turkey, CNBC-e on April 18, 2010; in the Netherlands, on April 7, 2010 on Veronica; and in Greece, on Nova Cinema on April 10, 2010. In New Zealand, the series began broadcasting on April 12, 2010 on TV One. In Italy, the miniseries began broadcast on May 9, 2010 on Sky Cinema 1; in Germany, on July 15, 2010 on Kabel eins. In Japan, the miniseries started July 18, 2010 on WOWOW. In South Africa, the miniseries started broadcasting on May 5, 2010 on the Mnet channel. In the US, the rights to the series were picked up by Ovation and it started airing sometime in 2019.

Marketing 
The first official US trailer for The Pacific aired on HBO prior to the season 2 premiere of True Blood on June 14, 2009. It showed footage of the three main characters, including a conversation between Leckie and Sledge, Basilone's marriage and numerous combat scenes. The trailer concluded with "2010" displayed on-screen -alluding to and confirming the series release date. A second trailer was released on the HBO website after which the date "March 2010" is displayed, giving a more specific series release date. On January 14, 2010, Comcast added on-demand content from the series, including a scene from The Pacific, interviews with the producers and character profiles. Another trailer was shown in February 2010 during Super Bowl XLIV, depicting several combat scenes. An extended trailer (3:47) to the miniseries can be viewed on the series' official website.

Episodes

Reception

Critical reception 
The Pacific received widespread critical acclaim. On the review aggregation website Rotten Tomatoes, the series holds an approval rating of 91% with an average rating of 8.8 out of 10, based on 44 reviews. The website's critical consensus reads, "An honest, albeit horrifying, exploration of World War II, The Pacific is a visually stunning miniseries not for the faint of heart." On Metacritic, the series has a weighted average score of 86 out of 100, based on 32 critics, indicating "universal acclaim".

Time magazine's James Poniewozik named it one of the Top 10 TV Series of 2010. IGN reviewer Ramsey Isler gave the entire miniseries an 8.5 out of 10, saying, "Although I don't think The Pacific overtakes Band of Brothers in terms of technical execution and overall entertainment value, many of the comparisons will be moot as The Pacific is a different kind of series with different goals. This series sought to look beyond the combat and it paints a full, vivid picture of the war and the people that fought in it through focused, individual stories. That's a tall order for any series to fulfill, and although The Pacific doesn't always come through with shining colors, it does make an admirable effort." IGN also reviewed each individual episode, with Episode 9 receiving a perfect 10 out of 10 score.

Awards and nominations

Notes

References 

Further reading
Masters of the Air
 Military History Magazine, Vol. 26, No. October 4/November 2009

External links 

 
  at HBO
 

2010 American television series debuts
2010 Australian television series debuts
2010 American television series endings
2010 Australian television series endings
2010s American television miniseries
2010s Australian television miniseries
American biographical series
English-language television shows
HBO original programming
Pacific War films
Peabody Award-winning television programs
Primetime Emmy Award for Outstanding Miniseries winners
Primetime Emmy Award-winning television series
Seven Network original programming
Television series based on actual events
Television series by Home Box Office
Television series by DreamWorks Television
Television series by Playtone
Television shows based on non-fiction books
Television shows filmed in Australia
Television shows set in the Northern Territory
Television shows set in Victoria (Australia)
Television shows about the United States Marine Corps
War television series
World War II television drama series
American military television series
Television shows scored by Hans Zimmer